Polisportiva Adolfo Consolini is an Italian women's volleyball club based in San Giovanni in Marignano and currently playing in the Serie A2.

Previous names
Due to sponsorship, the club have competed under the following names:
 Pallavolo di San Giovanni (1970–....)
 Polisportiva Adolfo Consolini (....–2014)
 Battistelli San Giovanni Marignano (2014–present)

History
The club started in 1970, when a group of players decided to form an amateur team. A few years later, groups of children and young people start enrolling to play and the club enters the regional league. Through the years the club restructured and progressed in the regional and national leagues, reaching Series D and C. At the end of the 2012–13 season, after missing a promotion by losing the Serie C final playoffs, the club acquired a Serie B2 licence for the following season. The club finish 4th on its Serie B2 debut season (2013–14) and in the following season achieved promotion to Serie B1. In its first season at B1 the club became champions and gained promotion to Serie A2.

Venue
The club play its home matches at the Palazzetto dello Sport in San Giovanni in Marignano. The venue has 420 spectators capacity (expandable to around 600).

Team
Season 2017–2018, as of September 2017.

References

External links
 Official website 

Italian women's volleyball clubs
Volleyball clubs established in 1970
1970 establishments in Italy
Province of Rimini
Sport in Emilia-Romagna